Ideen may refer to:

Ideen I, a 1913 philosophical work by Edmund Husserl
Ideen II, a posthumous philosophical work by Edmund Husserl withheld until 1952
Ideen & Argumente, series edited by Lutz Wingert
Deutschland – Land der Ideen, a German national marketing initiative (German Wikipedia)

See also
Idea
Ide (disambiguation)
Ides (disambiguation)
Idee (disambiguation)